Heteronyx queenlandicus is a beetle species that was first described in 1909. The beetle is part of the genus Heteronyx in the family Melolonthidae.

References

Melolonthinae
Beetles described in 1909